Amanda Ammar (born 6 February 1986) is a Canadian cross-country skier.

Ammar made her World Cup debut in 2005. Her best finish to date came in that year, when she teamed with Perianne Jones to finish 17th in the team sprint in Canmore. Her top individual performance came at the same event, a 27th place in the women's 15 km mass start.

Ammar competed in three events at the 2006 Olympics in Turin. She finished 49th in the qualifying portion of the  sprint, failing to advance to the quarterfinals, and also was a part of the Canadian relay team that finished 10th.

Cross-country skiing results
All results are sourced from the International Ski Federation (FIS).

Olympic Games

World Cup

Season standings

References

External links
 

1986 births
Living people
Canadian female cross-country skiers
Cross-country skiers at the 2006 Winter Olympics
Cross-country skiers at the 2014 Winter Olympics
Olympic cross-country skiers of Canada
Sportspeople from St. Albert, Alberta
21st-century Canadian women